The A Dogwood District is a high school conference of the Virginia High School League which draws most of its members from Lynchburg and Danville, Virginia areas. The schools in the Dogwood District compete in A Region B with the schools of the A Bull Run District, the A James River District and the A Shenandoah District. For several years, the district was a "combination district" with some teams in Group A and others in Group AA Region III, with often-complicated procedures for advancement to Region playoffs.

Member schools
 Altavista High School of Altavista, Virginia
 Appomattox High School of Appomattox, Virginia 
 Chatham High School of Chatham, Virginia 
 Dan River High School of Ringgold, Virginia
 Galileo Magnet High School of Danville, Virginia
 Gretna High School of Gretna, Virginia
 Nelson County High School of Lovingston, Virginia
 William Campbell High School of Naruna, Virginia

Virginia High School League